Chicken curry is a dish originating from the Indian subcontinent. It is common in the Indian subcontinent, Southeast Asia, Great Britain, Caribbean, and Japan. A typical curry from the Indian subcontinent consists of chicken stewed in an onion- and tomato-based sauce, flavoured with ginger, garlic, tomato puree, chilli peppers and a variety of spices, often including turmeric, cumin, coriander, cinnamon, and cardamom. Outside of South Asia, chicken curry is often made with a pre-made spice mixture known as curry powder.

Regional variations

Indian subcontinent
Indian cuisine has a large amount of regional variation, with many variations on the basic chicken curry recipe. Indian chicken curry typically starts with whole spices, heated in oil. A sauce is then made with onions, ginger, garlic, and tomatoes, and powdered spices. Bone-in pieces of chicken are then added to the sauce, and simmered until cooked through. In south India, coconut and curry leaves are also common ingredients. Chicken curry is usually garnished with coriander leaves, and served with rice or roti.

In south India, chicken curry may be thickened using coconut milk.

Caribbean
This dish was introduced to the Caribbean by indentured Indian girmitya workers. At that time, the dish was very similar to the chicken curry dish of India, consisting mostly of sauce with few chicken pieces. However, poultry in Trinidad and Tobago was so readily available, the dish began consisting of mainly chicken, flavored with curry spices. Typical preparation include washing and then seasoning and marinating the chicken meat in a green seasoning consisting of bandhania, dhania, pudina, thyme, scallion, onion, garlic, and peppers. Then the curry is prepared by first adding oil to the pot and then adding the phoran, which in the Caribbean consist of caripoulé, cut-up onions, peppers, and tomatoes, and garlic paste (some add ginger too). Some may also add saunf, jeera and meethi seeds along with the phoran. Then Madras curry powder (some also additionally add garam masala or any other masala they wish), mixed with water and green seasoning is added to the pot and fried up with the phoran in the oil, in a process known as bunjay or bujna. Then the marinated chicken is added to the pot and salt, black pepper, and sometimes roasted jeera powder is added. At this point aloo, pigeon peas, channa, or baigan is sometimes added. Then it is left to cook for 15–20 minutes on medium heat. Afterwards, water (some additionally add coconut milk) is added to make the soorwah or sauce/gravy and it is brought to a boil on lower to medium heat for 5–10 minutes. It is usually served with paratha or dalpuri roti or with dal bhat (dal and rice). Curry chicken and its derivatives are also popular in Suriname, Guyana, Jamaica, and other Caribbean territories with Indian and South Asian influence.

Southeast Asia

In Southeast Asia, where coconuts, and different spices originated, various native dishes made with coconut milk or curry pastes and eaten with rice are often collectively referred to as "curries" in English. Examples of these include Cambodian kari sach moan, Thai gaeng gai and Filipino ginataang manok. Chicken curries feature prominently in the repertoire of Burmese curries and in Burmese ohn no khao swè, a noodle soup of coconut milk and curried chicken.

However, derivatives of Indian chicken curry may be distinguished because they are relatively modern and are made with curry powder, curry tree leaves, or other Indian spices, like the Filipino chicken curry and the Malaysian chicken curry, although they still use ingredients native to Southeast Asia.

North America
Country captain chicken is a stewed chicken dish flavored with curry powder, popular in parts of the Southern United States. The Hobson-Jobson Dictionary states the following:

This dish dates back to the early 1800s. A British sea captain stationed in Bengal, India, shared the recipe for this dish with some friends at the major shipping port in Savannah, Georgia.

In 1940, Mrs. W.L. Bullard from Warm Springs, Georgia served this dish under the name Country Captain to Franklin D. Roosevelt (the 32nd president of the United States of America) and to General George S. Patton (a distinguished U.S. Army General). Their warm praise and keen liking and love of this dish were factors in reforging the Southern United States classic status. Roosevelt was so fond of Warm Springs, Georgia, that he built his only self-owned home in Warm Springs. It was a medium-sized, six room cottage, that he liked to call "The Little White House".

See also

Curry
Indian cuisine
Pakistani cuisine
 Pakistani meat dishes
Trinidad and Tobago cuisine

References

Bengali curries
Belizean cuisine
Burmese cuisine
Cambodian cuisine
Garlic dishes
Ginger dishes
Indian chicken dishes
Indian curries
Indo-Caribbean curries
Nepalese curries
Pakistani chicken dishes
Pakistani curries
Spicy foods
Sri Lankan curries
Thai curries
Trinidad and Tobago cuisine
Vietnamese chicken dishes
Fijian cuisine